Skep Point is a high ice-free point 5 nautical miles (9 km) west-northwest of Ula Point on the northeast coast of James Ross Island, Antarctica.

It was surveyed by the Falkland Islands Dependencies Survey (FIDS) first in 1945, then again in 1953. The United Kingdom Antarctic Place-Names Committee (UK-APC) name is descriptive: when viewed from seaward the feature resembles a skep (a type of beehive).

Headlands of James Ross Island